Nancy Diane Erbe is an American negotiation, conflict resolution and peacebuilding professor at California State University, Dominguez Hills (CSUDH). Over the course of her career, she has collaborated with a wide spectrum of individuals and groups representing more than 80 countries, from colleagues and associates to clients and students, on these issues. She is a Fulbright Scholar, Senior Specialist in Peace and Conflict Resolution, and a Fulbright Distinguished Chair (the most prestigious award among the Fulbright Scholar Awards; first and only to date for CSUDH). She has received four Fulbright Honors to date including two in the same year (2015) which is extremely rare. She is the recipient of the Presidential Outstanding Professor Award-2015. In 2015 she along with her husband facilitated the start of the  Arab world's first Master's Program in Peace Studies in West Bank. She has been a reviewer for Fulbright Commission in Egypt since 2016.

The U.S. Consulate General and Pontifical Catholic University of Rio de Janeiro (PUC-Rio) jointly hosted a special event to honor Prof. Erbe and celebrate the 12th anniversary and conclusion of the Fulbright Distinguished Chair in American Studies ( social inequalities, urban studies, and international relations). The U.S. Consulate General, Education USA representatives, PUC-Rio graduate students and academics celebrated the event. In concluding the event, the Consul General stressed  that the topic that Prof. Erbe presented in her keynote address was not only timely but also supported priority goals and objectives established by the U.S. Diplomatic Mission for U.S.-Brazil bilateral relations.

Life and education

Nancy Erbe graduated from University of Minnesota with a Juris Doctor (cum laude), and Straus Institute for Dispute Resolution, Pepperdine University School of Law with an L.L.M. She was the Founding Director of Rotary Center for International Studies in Peace and Conflict Resolution, University of California, Berkeley.  She has published over thirty-five books, law journals, and chapters/articles including Harvard Negotiation Law Journal and other renowned forums.  Her law article on human trafficking has been translated by the U.N. into several languages.

Awards and honors
2022-23 Invited by the Arctic University of Norway as Distinguished Arctic Scholar
2022 Invited by the U.S. Department of State to attend Alumni Thematic International Exchange Seminar on "Environmental Diplomacy and its Impact on American Society” in April 2022 in Denver, Colorado
2019 Fulbright-Nehru Specialist in Conflict Resolution and Peace in Asia: Issues and Challenges (Central University of Punjab, India )
2016- Reviewer: Fulbright Commission in Egypt
2015 Fulbright Distinguished Chair in American Studies (Brazil) 
2015 Presidential Outstanding Professor Award 
2015 Fulbright Senior Specialist in Peace and Conflict Resolution (West Bank)
2015 United Nations Nelson Mandela Prize-2015 (Nominated)
2010-14 Fulbright Reviewer for Senior Specialist in Peace and Conflict Resolution
2014 Women of Distinction (33rd Senate District) (Nominated)
2011 UNESCO-Madanjeet Singh Prize for the Promotion of Tolerance and Non-Violence (Nominated)
2009 Fulbright Senior Specialist in Peace and Conflict Resolution (Cyprus) at University of Nicosia and Eastern Mediterranean University
2002 Paul Harris Fellow, Rotary International
1985 Wennerstrom Award for outstanding contribution as Director of Legal Aid Clinic

Books, and law journals 
2023 Non-Violent Teaching and Parenting of Young Children: Emulating Optimal Conflict Resolution (Research Anthology on Modern Violence and Its Impact on Society)
2021 Holding These Truths (third edition): Empowerment and Recognition in Action (An Interactive Multicultural Case Study Curriculum for Catalyzing Justice with Conflict Skills and Tools)
2021 Living Inspiration: A Text/Workbook for Applied Ethics, Public Speaking, Human Relations and Creative Good
2021 Preventing and Reducing Violence in Schools and Society
2018 Transforming International Conflict Resolution to Catch Up with the Twenty-First Century, Wisconsin International Law Journal Vol. 35, No.1, Fall 2017
2017 Creating a Sustainable Vision of Nonviolence in Schools and Society
2017-To Date, Editor-in-Chief:Advances in Religious and Cultural Studies (ARCS): 80 Volumes
2014 Collective Efficacy:Interdisciplinary Perspectives on International Leadership 
2011 Negotiation Alchemy: Global Skills Inspiring & Transforming Diverging Worlds
2009 Negotiating and Mediating Peace in Africa, Pepperdine Dispute Resolution Law Journal (volume 9-3:457-494) 
2006 Appreciating Mediation's Global Role with Good Governance, Harvard Negotiation Law Review (volume 11:355-419)
2004 The Global Popularity and Promise of Facilitative ADR (Alternative Dispute Resolution), Temple International & Comparative Law Journal (volume 18, number 2).
2003 Holding These Truths: Empowerment and Recognition in Action-Interactive Case Study Curriculum for Multicultural Dispute Resolution
1984 Prostitutes: Victims of Men's Exploitation and Abuse, Journal of Law and Inequality (volume 2)

References

1956 births
Living people
People from Portsmouth, Virginia
University of Minnesota Law School alumni
Pepperdine University School of Law alumni
Metropolitan State University alumni
Fulbright Distinguished Chairs
University of California, Berkeley faculty
California State University, Dominguez Hills faculty
American women jurists
American legal scholars
American women legal scholars
American women academics
21st-century American women